Cyberstalking and cyberbullying are relatively new phenomena, but that does not mean that crimes committed through the network are not punishable under legislation drafted for that purpose. Although there are often existing laws that prohibit stalking or harassment in a general sense, legislators sometimes believe that such laws are inadequate or do not go far enough, and thus bring forward new legislation to address this perceived shortcoming. In the United States, for example, nearly every state has laws that address cyberstalking, cyberbullying, or both.

Issues at stake
Cyberbullying and cyberstalking, by their nature, define adversarial relationships. One person (or group), the provocateur, is exerting a view or opinion that the other person (or group), the target, finds offensive, hurtful, or damaging in some way. In a general sense, it would seem simple to legislate this type of behavior; slander and libel laws exist to tackle these situations. However, just as with slander and libel, it is important to balance the protection of freedom of speech of both parties with the need for protection of the target. Thus, something that may be deemed cyberbullying at first glance may, in fact, be more akin to something like parody or similar.

A 2006 National Crime Prevention Council survey found that some 40% of teens had experienced cyberbullying at some point in their lives, making the problem particularly widespread. Not only is the issue of cyberbullying extensive, it has adverse effects on adolescents: increased depression, suicidal behavior, anxiety, and increased susceptibility of drug use and aggressive behavior.

Legislation by country

Australia
Australia does not have specific cyberbullying legislation, although the scope of existing laws can be extended to deal with cyberbullying.

State laws can deal with some forms of cyberbullying, such as documents containing threats, and threats to destroy and damage property.

Commonwealth offences that criminalise the misuse of telecommunication services are also relevant when technology is used to communicate harassment or threats.

The Family Law Act 1975 (Cth) protects individuals from harassment, including harassment that occurs via electronic communications.  However, this is limited to the victims of family violence.

The Australian government has proposed specific cyberbullying laws to protect children.

United States

"Cyberbullying" versus "cyberstalking"

In the US, in practice, there is little legislative difference between the concepts of "cyberbullying" and "cyberstalking." The primary distinction is one of age; if adults are involved, the act is usually termed cyberstalking, while among children it is usually referred to as cyberbullying. However, this distinction is one of semantics, and many laws treat bullying and stalking as much the same issue.

Freedom of speech issues
First Amendment concerns often arise when questionable speech is uttered or posted online. This is equally true when dealing with cyberbullying. Particularly in instances where there are no laws explicitly against cyberbullying, it is not uncommon for defendants to argue that their conduct amounts to an exercise of their freedom of speech.

The courts have variously come down on either side of that debate, even within the same state. For example, a student in California who was suspended from school based on cyberbullying claims took the school district to court, citing a breach of her First Amendment rights; the court agreed with the student and found the school district had overstepped its authority. In another California case, in which a student was harassed after posting personal information online, the court found that threatening posts were not protected speech. The state of North Carolina invalidated such a law in State v. Bishop.

That said, true threats are not considered to be protected speech.

Organizations such as the American Civil Liberties Union have taken the view that cyberbullying is an overly expansive term, and that the First Amendment protects all speech, even the reprehensible; this protection would extend to the Internet.

In general, such organizations argue that while the need for legislation against cyberbullying may exist, legislators must take a cautious, reasoned approach to enacting laws, and not rush into creating laws that would curtail speech too much.

Internet free speech issues have certainly made their way through the court systems, even as far back as cases from the mid-90s. In the case of United States v. Baker, for example, an undergraduate at the University of Michigan was charged with crimes related to snuff stories he had posted on Internet newsgroups, stories that named one of his fellow students. After progressing through the courts, the charges against Baker were dismissed primarily on grounds that there was no evidence that Baker would actually act out the fantasies contained in those stories. This case is now considered a landmark in the realm of First Amendment issues on the Internet.

The need for new laws
The focus on legislating cyberbullying and cyberstalking has largely come about as a result of the perceived inadequacy, generally by legislators and parents of bullying victims, of existing laws, whether those existing laws cover stalking, unauthorized use of computer resources, or the like.
The motivation behind the bill in 1990 where 50 U.S. states and the federal government passed a bill to "criminalize" stalking was due to the cases of stalking against celebrities (Spitzberg & Hoobler, 2002).

For example, in the case of United States v. Lori Drew, in which Megan Meier had committed suicide after being bullied on MySpace, three of the four charges against the defendant (Drew) were actually in response to alleged violations of the Computer Fraud and Abuse Act, since specific statues against cyberbullying were not on the books. The jury eventually found Drew innocent of the charges (but guilty of a misdemeanor), a verdict that was later set aside by the judge. In this situation, legislators in Missouri, at the urging of the public and Meier's parents, passed "Megan's Law", primarily aimed at the crime of a person over 21 years of age bullying a person under 18 years of age.

In addition, prosecutors will sometimes use other legal avenues to prosecute offenders. In the case of Tyler Clementi, who killed himself after video of his homosexual encounter was broadcast on the Internet, prosecutors charged the defendants with invasion of privacy and computer crimes. Like the Meier case, the Clementi case spurred legislators (this time, in New Jersey) to pass a law specifically aimed at bullying, an "Anti-bullying Bill of Rights".

While some laws are written such that the focus on cyberbullying is the set of acts that occur within a school, others are more general, targeting cyberbullying no matter where it occurs. In addition, some of these newly written laws (like one in Connecticut) put more of an onus on the school system, mandating that the school's administration must intervene at the first sign of bullying.

Finally, it's not uncommon for cyberbullying to be coupled with "traditional", in-person bullying, for example, in the suicide of Phoebe Prince. Students at her school had bullied her for months in school, and that harassment eventually moved online as well. As in Connecticut, New Jersey, and Missouri, the Prince case led to stricter anti-bullying legislation in Massachusetts.

Legislation at the state level
Some U.S. states have begun to address the problem of cyberbullying. States that have passed legislation have done so generally in response to incidents within that state, to address what they believe to be shortcomings in federal laws, or to expand protection to victims above and beyond existing statutes.

There are laws that only address online harassment of children or focus on child predators as well as laws that protect adult cyberstalking victims, or victims of any age. While some sites specialize in laws that protect victims age 18 and under, Working to Halt Online Abuse is a help resource listing current and pending cyberstalking-related United States federal and state laws. It also lists those states that do not have laws yet and related laws from other countries.

California
California passed the first cyberstalking law in 1999. (§646.9 of the California Penal Code.) Its first use resulted in a six-year sentence for a man who harassed a woman who could identify him. After sending hundreds of threatening e-mails to an actress, another male convicted after spending months in jail waiting for trial was sentenced in 2001 to five years probation, forbidden access to computers and forced to attend mental health counseling. In 2011, a man was ordered to undergo psychiatric evaluation before sentencing for cyberstalking. On January 1, 2009, a California law became effective that allows schools to suspend or expel students who harass other students online. It also mandates that schools develop policies to address the problem. In addition, Section 1708.7 of the California Civil Code outlines grounds for an individual suing their cyberstalker and any accomplices for general damages, special damages, and punitive damages for cyberstalking.

Florida
Under Florida Statute 784.048, "cyberstalking," defined as to engage in a course of conduct to communicate, or to cause to be communicated, words, images, or language by or through the use of electronic mail or electronic communication, directed at a specific person, causing substantial emotional distress to that person and serving no legitimate purpose, is classified as a first degree misdemeanor. Cyberstalking a child under the age of 16 or a person of any age for which the offender has been ordered by the courts not to contact is considered "aggravated stalking," a third degree felony under Florida law. Cyberstalking in conjunction with a credible threat is also considered aggravated stalking.

In 2008, Florida passed the "Jeffrey Johnston Stand Up For All Students Act" in response to the suicide of 15-year-old Jeffrey Johnston, who had suffered cyberbullying over a long period of time. Unusual among state laws regarding cyberbullying is a provision that withholds funding for schools who are not in compliance with the provision that they must inform parents of those involved in cyberbullying—both the bully and the target.

Illinois
According to "Who@: Working to Halt Online Abuse":
Sec. 1-2. Harassment through electronic communications.
(a) Harassment through electronic communications is the use of electronic communication for any of the following
purposes:
Making any comment, request, suggestion or proposal which is obscene with an intent to offend;
Interrupting, with the intent to harass, the telephone service or the electronic communication service of any person;
Transmitting to any person, with the intent to harass and regardless of whether the communication is read in its entirety or at all, any file, document, or other communication which prevents that person from using his or her telephone service or electronic communications device;
Transmitting an electronic communication or knowingly inducing a person to transmit an electronic communication for the purpose of harassing another person who is under 13 years of age, regardless of whether the person under 13 years of age consents to the harassment, if the defendant is at least 16 years of age at the time of the commission of the offense;
Threatening injury to the person or to the property of the person to whom an electronic communication is directed or to any of his or her family or household members; or
Knowingly permitting any electronic communications device to be used for any of the purposes mentioned in this subsection (a).

(b) As used in this Act: 
"Electronic communication" means any transfer of signs, signals, writings, images, sounds, data or intelligence of any nature transmitted in whole or in part by a wire, radio, electromagnetic, photoelectric or photo-optical system. "Electronic communication" includes transmissions by a computer through the Internet to another computer.
"Family or household member" includes spouses, former spouses, parents, children, stepchildren and other persons related by blood or by present or prior marriage, persons who share or formerly shared a common dwelling, persons who have or allegedly share a blood relationship through a child, persons who have or have had a dating or engagement relationship, and persons with disabilities and their personal assistants. For purposes of this Act, neither a casual acquaintanceship nor ordinary fraternization between 2 individuals in business or social contexts shall be deemed to constitute a dating relationship.

(c) Telecommunications carriers, commercial mobile service providers, and providers of information services, including, but not limited to, Internet service providers and hosting service providers, are not liable under this Section, except for willful and wanton misconduct, by virtue of the transmission, storage, or caching of electronic communications or messages of others or by virtue of the provision of other related telecommunications, commercial mobile services, or information services used by others in violation of this Section. (Source: P.A. 95-849, eff. 1-1-09; 95-984, eff. 6-1-09; 96-328, eff. 8-11-09.)

Massachusetts
In response to Phoebe Prince's suicide, as well as that of Carl Walker—both of whom had been bullied before taking their lives—the Massachusetts legislature in 2010 passed what advocates call one of the toughest anti-bullying laws in the nation. The law prohibits both online taunting and physical or emotional abuse, and mandates training for faculty and students at schools. It further mandates that school administrators inform parents of bullying that occurs within the schools themselves.

Missouri
As noted previously, in 2008 Missouri revised its statutes on harassment to include harassment and stalking through electronic and telephonic communications and cyber-bullying after the suicide of Megan Meier.

New York 
New York state passed the Dignity For All Students Act, focusing primarily on elementary and middle school students.

Texas
Texas enacted the Stalking by Electronic Communications Act in 2001.

Washington state
Washington passed one of the first cyberstalking laws in 2004, which states that a person that uses electronic communications with the "intent to harass, intimidate, torment, or embarrass any other person" if they use lewd or obscene language, use language implying physical threats, or repeatedly harass a person; such is treated as a gross misdemeanor. However, the constitutionality of this law has been challenged in courts, with Judge Ronald B. Leighton of the United States District Court for the Western District of Washington ruled in February 2019 that the law as written could include "a large range of non-obscene, non-threatening speech" and that "As a result even public criticisms of public figures and public officials could be subject to criminal prosecution and punishment". Judge Leighton placed an injunction on the law to block its enforcement pending appeal. In 2021, the senate introduced two bills at the aim of addressing cyberharassment, the first of which, Senate Bill (SB) 5881, which was mainly aimed at preventing doxing, led to the same free speech concerns as the existing cyberstalking laws. The other bill, SB 5628, focused on online harassment and was written with the Anti-Defamation League to update the existing law to uphold the First Amendment.

Washington takes the approach of putting the focus on cyberbullying prevention and response directly on the schools. The law also requires schools to create policies to address bullying in a general sense.

Legislation at the federal level
Attempts at legislating cyberbullying have been tried at the federal level, primarily because the Commerce Clause of the U.S. Constitution specifically provides that only the federal government can regulate commerce between the states; this includes electronic communication over the Internet. An early example, the Violence Against Women Act, passed in 2000, included cyberbullying in a part of interstate status on harassment.

Megan Meier Cyberbullying Prevention Act
In 2009, Representative Linda Sánchez (D-CA) brought legislation titled the "Megan Meier Cyberbullying Prevention Act" before the U.S. House of Representatives. Her efforts were met with little enthusiasm, however, as Representatives from both the Republican and Democratic parties were concerned with the bill's impact on the freedom of speech. One of the oft-cited arguments against the bill comes from talk radio, with the concern expressed being that the law would be used to silence political opponents who use the airwaves to espouse divergent viewpoints. Another issue is that would make violation of the law a felony, rather than a misdemeanor as has been done in most states. Opponents of the bill argue that since the target of such legislation is nominally teenagers, this would put an undue burden on the prison system—since there are no long-term facilities for teenage offenders at the federal level. In addition, opponents call the proposed sentences (up to two years incarceration) excessive.

While Sánchez' bill was discussed in committee, it has not passed that stage .

Tyler Clementi Higher Education Anti-Harassment Act
In early March 2011, U.S. Senator Frank Lautenberg (D-NJ) and Representative Rush D. Holt, Jr. (D-NJ-12) introduced the "Tyler Clementi Higher Education Anti-Harassment Act", which would mandate that colleges and universities that receive federal funding have policies in place to address harassment—including cyberbullying. Universities would be required to address harassment that focuses on real or perceived race, color, national origin, sex, disability, sexual orientation, gender identity, or religion. The bill would also enable the U.S. Department of Education to provide training to institutes of higher education to prevent or address harassment. Furthermore, the bill addresses not just student-to-student harassment, but also harassment of students by faculty or staff as well.

However, like the Megan Meier Cyberbullying Prevention Act, this bill also has its detractors. Opponents point out that harassment on college campuses is already prohibited under existing laws; furthermore, they point out that harassment based on sexual orientation is also covered under existing statutes. In addition, as with the Sánchez bill, there are questions as to the free speech implications.

India
Prior to February 2013, there were no laws that directly regulate cyberstalking in India. India's Information Technology Act of 2000 (IT Act) was a set of laws to regulate the cyberspace. However, it merely focused on financial crimes and neglected interpersonal criminal behaviours such as cyberstalking (Behera, 2010; Halder & Jaishankar, 2008; Nappinai, 2010). In 2013, Indian Parliament made amendments to the Indian Penal Code, introducing cyberstalking as a criminal offence. Stalking has been defined as a man or woman who follows or contacts a man or woman, despite clear indication of disinterest to such contact by the man or woman, or monitoring of use of internet or electronic communication of a man or a woman. A man or a woman committing the offence of stalking would be liable for imprisonment up to three years for the first offence, and shall also be liable to fine and for any subsequent conviction would be liable for imprisonment up to five years and with fine.

Poland
Cyberstalking has been illegal since 2011.

New Zealand
New Zealand Minister of Justice Judith Collins plans to introduce a law that would make it an offence to incite people to commit suicide, or post material that is grossly offensive by the end of 2013.

International law

Convention on Cybercrime

International law emphasizes a supranational concept related to cybercrime. This is the Convention on Cybercrime, signed by the Council of Europe in Budapest on November 23, 2001.

The Global Cyber Law Database (GCLD) aims to become the most comprehensive and authoritative source of cyber laws for all countries.

Universal Declaration of Human Rights

 Article 5 of the Universal Declaration of Human Rights.

No one shall be subjected to torture or to cruel, inhuman or degrading treatment.

See also

References

Spitzberg, B. H., & Hoobler, G. (2002). Cyberstalking and the technologies of interpersonal terrorism. New Media & Society, 4(1), 71-92.
Behera, A. (2010). Cyber Crimes And Law In India. Indian Journal of Criminology & Criminalistics, 31(1), 16 – 30.
Halder, D. & Jaishankar, K. (2008). Cyber Crimes against Women in India: Problems, Perspectives and Solutions. TMC Academic Journal, 3(10), 48-62.
Nappinai, N, S. (2010). Cyber Crime Law in India: Has Law Kept Pace with Emerging Trends? An Empirical Study. Journal of International Commercial Law and Technology, 5(1), 22-27.

External links
 State Cyberstalking, Cyberharassment and Cyberbullying Laws, National Conference of State Legislatures, United States
 State Cyberbullying Laws (United States), A brief review of state cyberbullying laws and policies, Megan Meier Foundation

Stalking
Cyberbullying
Privacy law
Computer law